The Pacific Netball Series is an annual netball competition organised by the Oceania Netball Federation. This is played by the top four non elite teams in the INF World Rankings.

The first competition was hosted by Samoa in 2009. Cook Islands won the inaugural tournament with hosts Samoa second. Papua New Guinea was third. Fiji pulled out of the event. 

The second competition was held in the Cook Islands in 2010. Fiji were the winners over Samoa. Hosts Cook Islands took third with Papua New Guinea fourth.

The third competition was held in Papua New Guinea in 2011. Fiji again were the winners over Cook Islands. Samoa took third with hosts Papua New Guinea fourth.

Results

See also
Oceania Netball Federation

References

 
International netball competitions
Netball competitions in Oceania
2009 establishments in Oceania
Recurring sporting events established in 2009